General elections were held in Western Samoa on 26 February 1988. Voting was restricted to Matai and citizens of European origin ("individual voters"), with the Matai electing 45 MPs and Europeans two. Although the Human Rights Protection Party received more than double the number of votes of the Coalition of the Christian Democratic Party and the Va'ai Kolone Group, it won one fewer seat. However, on the day of the election of the Prime Minister by Parliament, one Coalition MP defected to the HRPP, allowing its leader Tofilau Eti Alesana to be elected Prime Minister.

Results

See also
List of members of the Legislative Assembly of Western Samoa (1988–1991)

References

Western Samoa
General
Elections in Samoa
Election and referendum articles with incomplete results